Señorita Panamá 1999, the 17th Señorita Panamá pageant and 34th celebration of the Miss Panamá contest, was held in Teatro Anayansi Centro de Convenciones Atlapa, Panama city, Panama, on September 15, 1999. After weeks of events. The winner of the pageant was Analía Núñez.

The pageant was broadcast live on RPC-TVPanamá Channel 4. About 12 contestants from all over Panamá competed for the prestigious crown. At the conclusion of the final night of competition, outgoing titleholder Yamani Esther Saied Calviño of Panama Centro crowned Analía Núñez Sagripanti of Chiriquí as the new Señorita Panamá.

In the same night was celebrated the election of the "Señorita Panamá World",  was announced the winner of the Señorita Panamá Mundo title. Señorita Panamá World 1998 Lorena del Carmen Zagía Miró of Panama Centro crowned Jessenia Casanova Reyes of Panama Centro as the new Señorita Panamá World. Also was selected the representative for the Miss Asia Pacific pageant Marianela Salazar Guillén Panama Centro was crowned by Abimelec Rodríguez of Panama Centro.

Núñez competed in the 49th edition, Miss Universe 2000 pageant, held at the Eleftheria Stadium, Nicosia, Cyprus on May 12, 2000.

In other hands Casanova Reyes competed in Miss World 1999, the 49th edition of the Miss World pageant, was held on 4 December 1999 at the Olympia Hall in London, United Kingdom. Salazar Guillén competed in Miss Asia Pacific 2000 pageant, the 30th edition of Miss Asia Pacific Pageant and was held on December 2, 2000 in Philippines, where she placed as 1st runner up.

Final result

Special awards

Contestants
These are the competitors who were selected this year.

Election schedule

Tuesday September 15, Final night, coronation Señorita Panamá 1999

Candidates notes
Analía Núñez was 13th overall in the preliminaries in Miss Universe 2000.
Marianela Salazar represented Panamá in Miss Asia Pacific 2000 where she was the 1st runner-up, Reinado internacional del cafe 2000 also was 1st runner-up; Miss Mesoamerica 2000 2nd runner-up and Miss Hawaiian Tropic.
Blanca Herrera become a recognized TV Host in Panamá.

Historical significance

Chiriquí won Señorita Panamá for the first time.

References

External links
  Señorita Panamá  official website

Señorita Panamá
1999 beauty pageants